Rhododendron denudatum (皱叶杜鹃) is a rhododendron species native to northwestern Guizhou, southwestern Sichuan, and eastern Yunnan in China, where it grows at altitudes of . It is a shrub or small tree that grows to 3–6 meters in height, with leathery leaves that are elliptic-lanceolate to ovate-lanceolate, and 10–16 × 2.5–5 cm in size. Flowers are rose-colored with deep crimson flecks.

References
 H. Léveillé, Repert. Spec. Nov. Regni Veg. 13: 339. 1914.

denudatum